Yari Kofi Kuranchi Dakinah (born 1 February 1980) is a Danish former professional footballer who played as a defender.

Club career
Born in Copenhagen, Dakinah played professionally in Denmark for FC Copenhagen, Herfølge BK and FC Nordsjælland and in England for Walsall, Kidderminster Harriers.

He signed for Walsall on a free transfer in July 2004, before being released in November 2004. At Walsall, Dakinah made two first-team appearances - one in the Football League and one in the League Cup. After leaving Walsall, Dakinah played for the reserve team of Kidderminster Harriers.

In 2006, Dakinah signed with Icelandic club Grindavík, which became his final professional club. Afterwards, he played lower league football in Denmark with Ølstykke, B.93 and Skjold Birkerød. In April 2020, he made his comeback as a player as a 40-year-old, after having left Skjold Birkerød in 2013.

International career
He earned ten caps for the Denmark U19 national team.

Personal life
Dakinah also holds South African nationality.

References

1980 births
Living people
Danish men's footballers
Danish expatriate men's footballers
Denmark youth international footballers
F.C. Copenhagen players
Walsall F.C. players
Kidderminster Harriers F.C. players
IF Skjold Birkerød players
English Football League players
Association football defenders
Danish Superliga players
Danish expatriate sportspeople in England
Expatriate footballers in England
Boldklubben af 1893 players
Fremad Valby players
Herfølge Boldklub players
FC Nordsjælland players
Grindavík men's football players
Ølstykke FC players
Expatriate footballers in Iceland
Danish expatriate sportspeople in Iceland
Úrvalsdeild karla (football) players
Danish 1st Division players
Danish 2nd Division players
Denmark Series players
Footballers from Copenhagen